Otto IV (1248, Ornans – 17 March 1303, Melun) was the count of the Free County of Burgundy from 1279 until 1303.

Life
Otto was the son of Hugh of Châlons and Adelaide, Countess Palatine of Burgundy. Upon his father's death in 1266/7, he became Count of Châlons. His mother, Adelaide, died on 8 March 1279, and Otto inherited her county. However, he was unable to secure real power in the county until 1295. His elder daughter Joan II succeeded in the County of Burgundy, which was later given as dowry on her marriage to Philip.

His wife Mahaut drew up a contract on 4 June 1312 with the famous tomb maker Jean Pepin de Huy to make a tomb. The contract specifies a tomb made of stone and alabaster. Otto was to be shown as an armed knight with a shield, sword and armor. A lion was shown beneath his feet with two angels to support the pillow under his head. The tomb no longer exists, but the designs have been preserved.

Marriage and children
Otto married Philippa of Bar in 1271. The marriage was childless.

In 1285, Otto married his second wife, Mahaut of Artois. They had:
 Joan (c.1291 - 1330) married Philip, Count of Poitier in 1307
 Blanche (c.1296 - 1326) married Charles, Count of La Marche.
 Robert (c.1300 – 1317).

References

Sources

1248 births
1303 deaths
People from Doubs
Counts of Burgundy
Chalon-Arlay